The List of HTC–Highroad riders contains riders from the team which have had the names Team Deutsche Telekom, T-Mobile Team, Team High Road, Team Columbia, Team Columbia–HTC, Team HTC–Columbia, and presently, .

2011 (HTC–Highroad)
Ages as of 1 January 2011.

2010 (Team HTC–Columbia)
Ages as of 1 January 2010.

2009 (Team Columbia–High Road/Team Columbia–HTC)
Ages as of 1 January 2009.

2008 (Team High Road/Team Columbia)
Ages as of 1 January 2008.

2007 (T-Mobile Team)
Ages as of 1 January 2007.

* Fired because of positive doping tests

2006 (T-Mobile Team)
Ages as of 1 January 2006.

2005 (T-Mobile Team)
Ages as of 1 January 2005.

2004 (T-Mobile Team)
Ages as of 1 January 2004.

2003 (Telekom)
Ages as of 1 January 2003.

2002 (Telekom)
Ages as of 1 January 2002.

2001 (Telekom)
Ages as of 1 January 2001.

2000 (Telekom)

Reference

1999 (Telekom)

Reference

1998 (Telekom)

Reference

1997 (Telekom)

Reference

1996 (Telekom)

Reference

1995 (Telekom)

Reference

1994 (Telekom)

Reference

1993 (Telekom)

Reference

1992 (Telekom)

Reference

1991 (Telekom)

Reference

See also
HTC–Highroad
List of HTC–Highroad wins
2011 HTC–Highroad season
2010 Team HTC–Columbia season
List of Team Specialized–lululemon riders

Riders
High Road